Robin Femy (born 19 October 1989) is a skier and sighted guide from Canada. He currently serves as Mac Marcoux's guide. The pair won three medals in alpine skiing at the 2014 Winter Paralympics, including gold in the men's visually impaired giant slalom.

Femy skied at the 2011 IPC Alpine Skiing World Championships with Chris Williamson. The pair scored a handful of medals; this included second in the men's visually impaired Super-G race, third in the visually impaired men's downhill, men's visually impaired Super Combined and slalom races.

References

Canadian male alpine skiers
Living people
1989 births
Paralympic sighted guides
Medalists at the 2014 Winter Paralympics
Paralympic gold medalists for Canada
Paralympic bronze medalists for Canada
Paralympic alpine skiers of Canada
Alpine skiers at the 2014 Winter Paralympics
Paralympic medalists in alpine skiing